Arik Levy was born in Tel Aviv. An artist and industrial designer, he attended the Art Center Europe in Switzerland where he graduated with distinction in 1991. Levy employs a multi-disciplinary approach in both the art and industrial design fields. His works have been included in multiple museum collections. Levy lives and works in Paris.

Biography

After graduating at Art Center College of Design (Art Center, La Tour-de-Peilz, Switzerland), Levy went to Japan where he consolidated his ideas producing products and pieces for exhibitions. He then returned to Europe where he contributed his artistry to contemporary dance and opera creating set designs. 
Known for his sculptures and the "Rock" series, Levy's work is collected in public and private collections. His sculpture RockGrowth Atomium 808 was acquired by Atomium in Brussels.

Art exhibitions and installations
2020
 Installation of the monumental sculpture RockGrowth 2000, on Bratyev Vesninykh Boulevard, Moscow. It is 21 meters high and made of mirror polished stainless steel.
2019
 BLICKACHSEN 12, 05/2019 to 10/2019, Bad Homburg and Frankfurt Rhine-Main
2017
 Louise Alexander Gallery, Porto Cervo "Sculpture park"
 Installation of RockTripleFusion VerticalGiant 660 and RockTripleFusionGiant 500, Taipei. two monumental public sculptures commissioned to be part of the residential project Da-An Park Towers by Sir Richard Rogers, in Taipei, Taiwan.
 Baker Museum, Florida – solo exhibition – 09/2017 
 Swarovski Crystal Worlds Museum, Wattens – 11/2017 
 Louise Alexander Gallery, Nomad, Monaco – Solo exhibition – 04/2017 
 Aeroplastic, Brussels – group exhibition – 04/2017 
 Setareh gallery, Düsseldorf – I Remembered It Differently - solo exhibition – 03/2017 
 Samsung, commission for BaselWorld – Galaxy Stand – 03/2017 
 Jensen Gallery, Sydney – group exhibition – 03/2017 
2016
 Atomium, Brussels – RockGrowth 808 Atomium – public space permanent installation – 04/2014 
 Alon Segev Gallery, Tel Aviv – Absent Presence - solo exhibition – 03/11/2016 
 Design Miami, Miami – Ice by Arik Levy – 12/2016 
 Les Rencontres D’arles, Arles – 20/20 – Group Exhibition – 07/2016 to 09/2016 
 PODGORNY ROBINSON gallery temporary space, Saint Paul de Vence – Summer group exhibition – 07/2016
 Louise Alexander Gallery, Porto Cervo "Crater"
2015
Set decoration for the fifth season of American Horror Story
 Marlborough Gallery at Art Basel Hong Kong
 Louise Alexander Gallery, Shanghai, China – DesignShanghai 2015 – solo exhibition – 03/2015 
2014
 Louise Alexander Gallery, Porto Cervo – Uncontrolled Nature – solo exhibition – 06/2014
 Ilan Engel Gallery, Paris – New Works – solo exhibition – 06/2014
 RockGrowth 808 Atomium – Atomium, Brussels - public space permanent installation and exhibition – 04/2014
 Aeroplastics Contemporary, Brussels – Full House: 100 artists – group exhibition – 04/2014
 Fondation EDF, Paris – Que la lumière soit – RewindableLight art video – 04/2014
2013 
 Musée des Arts Décoratifs, Paris – AbstractRock series and other artworks alongside the exhibition “Dans la ligne de mire” – 09/2013 to 03/2014
 Vitra Museum, Weil am Rhein – RewindableLight art video – Lightopia group exhibition – 09/2013 to 03/2014
 Galerist, Istanbul – Activated Nature – solo exhibition – 11/2013
 Enclos des Bernardins, Paris – RockGrowth installation – 09/2013
 Mitterrand+Cramer, Geneva – new sculptures – solo exhibition – 03/2013
 Galerie Maubert, Paris – Nouvelle Lune – group exhibition – 04/2013
 Mitterrand+Cramer, Geneva – new sculptures – solo exhibition – 03/2013
 Alon Segev Gallery, London – Art13 London – art fair – 02/2013
 Priveekollektie, Rotterdam – Raw Art Fair – art fair – 02/2013
 Priveekollektie, Grand–Saconnex, Switzerland – Artgenève – art fair – 01/2013

2012
 Passage de Retz, Paris – Nothing is quite as it seems – solo exhibition – 11/2012
 Fondazione Bisazza, Montecchio Maggiore, Italy – Experimental growth – solo exhibition – 11/2012
 Swarovski Crystal Worlds, Wattens, Austria – Transparent Opacity – solo exhibition – 09/2012
 Galerist Tepebaş, Istanbul – Le Jardin de la Spéculation Cosmique – group exhibition – 11/2012
 Alon Segev Gallery, Tel Aviv – Genetic Intimacy – solo exhibition – 09/2012
 London Design Museum, London – Osmosis Interactive installation at Swarovski's Digital Crystal – group exhibition – 09/2012
 Jardin du Hauvel, Saint-Hymer – Art et Nature – group exhibition curated by Jean–Gabriel Mitterrand – 06/2012
 Hedge Gallery, San Francisco – Flections – group exhibition curated by Sabrina Buell – 06/2012
 Priveekollektie, Heusden aan de Maas – EmotionalDeflection – solo exhibition – 05/2012
 Galerie Maubert, Paris – Le Sacre du Printemps – group exhibition – 04/2012
 Alon Segev Gallery, Tel Aviv – Arik Levy & Guy Yanai – group exhibition – 03/2012
 Stonetouch, Geneva – Candelabra – group exhibition – Nuit des Bains – 03/2012

2011
 Natural History Museum, London – installation – Regeneration: Osmosis Chaton Superstructures at the Natural History Museum – 09/2011
 JGM. Galerie, Paris – M+C Design 2008–2011 – group exhibition – Facetmoon + WireFlowRandom + BigRock – 03/2011
 Galerie Pierre–Alain Challier, Paris – Un regard d'Obsidienne – group exhibition – Absence – 01/2011
 Design Museum Holon, Israel – Post Fossil: excavating 21st century creation – group exhibition – RockFusion + SelfArcheology – 01/2011

2010
 21_21 Design Sight gallery, Tokyo – Reality Lab – group exhibition – Fixing Nature Log installation – 11/2010
 Alon Segev Gallery, Tel Aviv – Natural Disorder – solo exhibition – 10/2010 
 Mitterrand+Cramer, Geneva – Geotectonic – solo exhibition – 09/2010 
 Priveekollektie, Heusden aan de Maas, The Netherlands – My Name is Arik – solo exhibition – 09/2010 
 Istanbul Modern – Log Forest – 08/2010 
 Personality Disorder Social Codes installation – No Holds Barred – Art Amsterdam – 05/2010
 Eighth Veil Gallery, Los Angeles – Out there logging – solo exhibition – 05/2010
 Santa Monica Museum of Art, USA – Luminescence, between Fire & Ice – solo exhibition – 05/2010
 Lambretto Art Project, Milano – 13 798 grams of design – group exhibition – RockFusion Brass – 04/2010
 21_21 Design Sight gallery, Tokyo – Post Fossil: excavating 21st century creation – group exhibition – RockFusion and SelfArcheology – 04/2010

2009
 Slott Gallery, Paris – Confessions – group exhibition Préliminaires – 12/2009 
 Kenny Schachter/ROVE, London – Fruit & Flowers – group exhibition 10/2009 
 Vienna Design Week, Vienna – Arik Levy & Swarovski Osmosis Chaton Superstructures at the Liechtenstein Museum and TableScape architectural Jewellery at Sotheby's – 10/2009 
 Swarovski Crystal Palace, Ex Magazzini di Porta Genova Milano – Osmosis – 04/2009 
 Oratorio Basilica di S. Ambrogio, Milano – Prophets & Penitents, Confessions of a Chair – group exhibition– Identity Disorder chair – 04/2009 
 Galleria Nina Lumer, Milano – Love Design – group exhibition – Powered by JimmyJane – 04/2009

2008
 Design Miami, Miami – Beyond Organic: Design In the State of Nature – group exhibition – 12/2008 
 Kenny Schachter/ROVE, London – Diversion – group exhibition – 11/2008 
 Chatsworth, UK – Beyond Limits – group exhibition – Log Corner + Log Corner Grid – 09/2008 
 Sudeley Castle, UK – The Artist's Playground – group exhibition – Moon Tables – 06/2008 
 Wright20, Chicago, IL – Absent Nature – 04/2008 
 Barbara Davis Gallery, Houston, TX – Imperative Design – group exhibition – 01/2008 
 Galerie Alain Gutharc, Paris – Propositions lumineuses 2 – group exhibition – 01/2008

2007
 Galerie NumerisCausa, Paris – Il était une fois... – group exhibition for the gallery's opening – Shine light sculpture – 12/2007 
 The Mews Gallery by Rabih Hage, London – Sitting Pretty – exhibition of photos by Jonathan Root, featuring a portrait of Arik Levy with his creation Identity Disorder – 09/2007 
 Dialogues méditerranéens, St. Tropez – Big Rock – installation – 07/2007 
 Centre des arts, Enghien–les–Bains – L’Autre – 01/2007

2006
 Drugstore Publicis, Paris – MiniMaxi – installation – 09/2006 
 Baccarat, Paris – Phantom – installation – Designer's Days 06/2006 
 Passage de Retz, Paris – Big Rock – permanent installation – 05/2006 
 Centre culturel français, Milan – République Libre du Design – installation Organ – 04/2006

2005
 Passage de Retz / Mouvements modernes, Paris – Du Bois Don't On Se Chauffe – 12/2005 
 Gallery Alain Gutharc – Propositions lumineuses – 2005–2006 
 Centre Georges Pompidou, Paris – D.Day – installation From primitive to virtual – 06/2005 
 Garanti Gallery, Istanbul – Feel before you see – 05/2005 
 National Glass Centre/Glass Gallery, Sunderland, UK – Brilliant – 02/2005

2004
 Park Ryusook Gallery, Korea – Love counts – 09/2004 
 Victoria & Albert Museum, London – Brilliant – 02/2004

2002
 Hertzlia Museum, Israel Video Zone Biennale – Two stars hotel – in collaboration with Sigalit Landau, 2002

2001
 Pascale Cottard–Ollsson Gallery, Stockholm – personal exhibition – 11/2001

2000
 Isart Contemporary Art Gallery, Munich – Virtual light – 2000 
 Isart Contemporary Art Gallery, Munich – Virtual/Religious’ – 2000

1997
 Sculpture Biennale Ein Hod, Israel – Humanism 2020 – 1997

1996
 Louisiana Museum, Danemark – Design og identitet – 1996

1986
 Sculpture Park, Jaffa, Israel – 1986

Museum collections
 The Art Institute of Chicago, Chicago – Contemporary Domestic Confessional – 2010
 Centre Georges Pompidou, Paris – Installation Fractal Cloud – 2006
 Seoul Arts Center, Hangaram Design Museum, Seoul – Umbilical Light – 2005
 Centre Georges Pompidou, Paris – Xm3 duo, Light pocket, Alchemy tube lights – 2002 
 HSBC Connection Collection / Volume 1 – Rockshelves + Rocksplit – 2009

Competitions and awards
2014
 Design Plus powered by Light+Building 2014 award: Best of Design Plus - Wireflow pendants by Arik Levy for Vibia – Frankfurt
 Wallpaper* Design Awards 2014 – Best line work – Wireflow pendants by Arik Levy for Vibia – London

2013
 Best of Year 2013 awards/INTERIOR DESIGN : category Lighting: Floor and Sconce – Fold lighting collection by Arik Levy for Vibia – USA

2011
 Good Design award: Emu Pattern collection for Coalesse – USA 
 Design Plus powered by ISH 2011 award: best product – Structure collection for Inbani – Frankfurt

2010
 Grand Prix Stratégies du Design 2010: best Branding Packaging – bottle A Scent for Issey Miyake – Paris

2009
 Red Dot Design Award: best product design 2009 – SH05 ARIE shelving system by E15 – Essen
 The Interior Innovation Award, category “Best of the Best” – SH05 Arie shelving system by E15 – Köln
 Wallpaper* Design Awards 2009 – Best new beds – Landscape by Arik Levy for Verardo – Italy
 Wallpaper* Design Awards 2009 – Best shelving – Fluid by Arik Levy for Desalto – Italy

2008
 JANUS Award for Industry, design and innovation 2008 – Log Light by Saasz – Paris
 Label VIA, Torch table lamp by Baccarat – France, 2008
 Red Dot Design Award: best product design 2008 – Mistic collection by Gaia & Gino – Essen, Germany
 ELLE Decoration International Design Awards 2008 – Designer of the year

2008
 Wallpaper* Design Awards 2007 – Best modular furniture – Cubic Meter by A. Levy for Kenny Schachter – London 
 Design PLUS Award 2008, Mitos glassware collection by Kvetna – Frankfurt
 Globes de Cristal Award Arts et Culture 2008 Paris Première – Best Designer – Paris

2007
 JANUS Award for Industry, design and innovation 2007, Invisible system by Visplay – Paris
 Wallpaper* Design Awards 2007, Furniture designer of the year, finalist – London
 Wallpaper* Design Awards 2007 – Best centerpiece – Mistic collection by Gaia & Gino – London

2006
 Design PLUS Award 2006, Mistic vase by Gaia&Gino

2005
 The Interior Innovation Award, category “Best detail” 4to8 table by Desalto – Köln
 The Interior Innovation Award, category “Best detail” Liko glass table by Desalto – Köln
 Elle Decoration magazine Design Award for lighting (2nd edition)

2003
 The Interior Innovation Award, category “Best of the Best” Liko table by Desalto – Köln

2002
 Prix de l’Observeur du Design/APCI, Arik sofa by Ligne Roset – France
 Grand Prix de la Presse Internationale de la Critique du Meuble Contemporain, Arik sofa by Ligne Roset – France, 2002
 Label VIA, Arik sofa by Ligne Roset – France, 2002

2001
 Cartier international office furniture and light system in collaboration with Vitra 
 Label VIA, Slim stacking chair by Ligne Roset – France, 2001
 George Nelson Award, Interior magazine, 2001

2000
 Label Via, U cd shelf by Ligne Roset – France, 2000
 iF Award light fixtures – Germany, 2000
 L'Express Best of category Light – France, 2000
 Carte blanche VIA – France

1999
 Label VIA, Light Pocket lamp by Ligne Roset – France
 Grand Prix de la Presse Internationale de la Critique du Meuble Contemporain, Cloud lamp – France
 Design PLUS Award 1999, Ambiente Fair, Seed porcelaine lamp – Frankfurt

1997
 Mouvement français de la qualité – posters for “Qualité 97” campaign – Paris, 1997

1991
 Seiko Epson (International Art Center Award) – Japan, 1991

References

External links

Arik Levy at Louise Alexander Gallery

1963 births
Artists from Paris
French contemporary painters
Living people
People from Tel Aviv
Israeli Jews
Israeli sculptors
French installation artists
20th-century sculptors
21st-century sculptors